Evalea waikikiensis is a species of sea snail, a marine gastropod mollusk in the family Pyramidellidae, the pyrams and their allies.

Description
The white shell has an inflated conical shape. Its length measures 3.1 mm. Its surface is covered with minute striae, that are somewhat more widely spaced.

Distribution
This species occurs in the Pacific Ocean off the Hawaiian islands Maui and Oahu.

References

External links
 To World Register of Marine Species

Pyramidellidae
Gastropods described in 1918